The Alexandra, Eildon, Marysville Standard is published by Alexandra Newspapers in Victoria, Australia.

The newspaper was first published biweekly as the Alexandra Times by John Whitelaw on 2 June 1868. In its first editorial the newspaper committed to "representing the commercial and mining interests of the district". The newspaper’s motto was veritas vincit omnia, truth conquers all.

The Alexandra Times became the Alexandra and Yea Standard in 1877. The Standard was known for its detailed recording of local affairs in the nineteenth century, including mining, farming and agriculture, especially dairy and timber milling. The newspaper later expanded to include Acheron, Eildon, Gobur, Taggerty, Thornton and Yarck and adopted its current name in March 1989.

Footnotes

External links 

Digitised World War I Victorian newspapers from the State Library of Victoria

Newspapers published in Victoria (Australia)
Newspapers established in 1868
1868 establishments in Australia
Newspapers on Trove